A chart with the best selling manga in Japan is published weekly by Oricon. This list includes the manga that reached the number one place on that chart in 2014.

Chart history

References 

2014 manga
2014 in comics
2014